Leucocosmia is a genus of moths of the family Noctuidae.

References
Natural History Museum: Lepidoptera genus database
Biodiversity Heritage Library: Bibliography for Leucocosmia

Hadeninae